The 2002 Giro d'Italia was the 85th edition of the Giro d'Italia, one of cycling's Grand Tours. The Giro began with a  prologue that navigated through the streets of the Dutch city Groningen. The race came to a close with a mass-start stage that ended in the Italian city of Milan. Twenty-two teams entered the race that was won by the Italian Paolo Savoldelli of the Index Alexia team. Second and third were the American Tyler Hamilton and Italian Pietro Caucchioli.

In the race's other classifications,  rider Julio Alberto Pérez won the mountains classification, Massimo Strazzer of the  team won the intergiro classification, and Acqua & Sapone rider Mario Cipollini won the points classification.  finished as the winners of the Trofeo Fast Team classification, ranking each of the twenty-two teams contesting the race by lowest cumulative time. The other team classification, the Trofeo Super Team classification, where the teams' riders are awarded points for placing within the top twenty in each stage and the points are then totaled for each team was also won by Alessio.

Teams

A total of 22 teams were invited to participate in the 2002 Giro d'Italia. Each team sent a squad of nine riders, so the Giro began with a peloton of 198 cyclists. Out of the 198 riders that started this edition of the Giro d'Italia, a total of 140 riders made it to the finish in Milan.

The 22 teams that took part in the race were:

Route and stages

The route for the 2002 Giro d'Italia was unveiled by race director Carmine Castellano on 17 November 2001 in Milan. It contained three time trial events, all of which were individual. In the stages containing categorized climbs, four had summit finishes: stage 5, to Limone Piemonte; stage 11, to Campitello Matese; stage 13, to San Giacomo; and stage 17, to Passo Coe. The organizers chose to include two rest days. When compared to the previous year's race, the race was  shorter, contained one more rest day, and one more individual time trial. In addition, this race had an opening prologue like the year before.

Classification Leadership

In the 2002 Giro d'Italia, five different jerseys were awarded. For the general classification, calculated by adding each cyclist's finishing times on each stage, and allowing time bonuses for the first three finishers on mass-start stages, the leader received a pink jersey. This classification is considered the most important of the Giro d'Italia, and the winner is considered the winner of the Giro.

Additionally, there was a points classification, which awarded a mauve jersey. In the points classification, cyclists got points for finishing in the top 15 in a stage. The stage win awarded 25 points, second place awarded 20 points, third 16, fourth 14, fifth 12, sixth 10, and one point fewer per place down the line, to a single point for 15th. In addition, points could be won in intermediate sprints.

There was also a mountains classification, which awarded a green jersey. In the mountains classifications, points were won by reaching the top of a mountain before other cyclists. Each climb was categorized as either first, second, or third category, with more points available for the higher-categorized climbs. The highest point in the Giro (called the Cima Coppi), which in 2002 was the Passo Pordoi, afforded more points than the other first-category climbs.

The fourth jersey represented the intergiro classification, marked by a blue jersey. The calculation for the intergiro is similar to that of the general classification, in each stage there is a midway point that the riders pass through a point and where their time is stopped. As the race goes on, their times compiled and the person with the lowest time is the leader of the intergiro classification and wears the blue jersey.

There were also two classifications for teams. The first was the Trofeo Fast Team. In this classification, the times of the best three cyclists per team on each stage were added; the leading team was the team with the lowest total time. The Trofeo Super Team was a team points classification, with the top 20 placed riders on each stage earning points (20 for first place, 19 for second place and so on, down to a single point for 20th) for their team.

The rows in the following table correspond to the jerseys awarded after that stage was run.

Final standings

General classification

Points classification

Mountains classification

Intergiro classification

Trofeo Fast Team classification

Trofeo Super Team classification

Minor classifications

Other less well-known classifications, whose leaders did not receive a special jersey, were awarded during the Giro. Other awards included the Combativity classification, which was a compilation of points gained for position on crossing intermediate sprints, mountain passes and stage finishes. Italian Massimo Strazzer won the Most Combative classification. The Azzurri d'Italia classification was based on finishing order, but points were awarded only to the top three finishers in each stage. The Azzurri d'Italia classification was won by Mario Cipollini. The Trofeo Fuga Piaggio classification rewarded riders who took part in a breakaway at the head of the field, each rider in an escape of ten or fewer riders getting one point for each kilometre that the group stayed clear. The classification was won by Mariano Piccoli. Teams were given penalty points for minor technical infringements.  was the most successful in avoiding penalties after not being penalized during the race, and so won the Fair Play classification.

References

Citations

 
Giro d'Italia by year
Giro d'Italia
Giro d'Italia
Giro d'Italia
May 2002 sports events in Europe
June 2002 sports events in Europe
Cycling in Groningen (province)
Sports competitions in Groningen (city)